Max Joseph Bastelberger (19 March 1851, Würzburg, Bavaria – 1 January 1916, Munich, Bavaria) was a German medical doctor and entomologist. He was specialized on geometrid moths and described 351 new taxa.

Species named in his honor include
 Alcis bastelbergeri
 Entephria bastelbergeri
 Dysphania bastelbergeri
 Eupithecia bastelbergeri
 Zamarada bastelbergeri

Publications
 Max Bastelberger, 1905. Beschreibung neuer und Besprechung weniger bekannter Geometriden aus meiner Sammlung. - Entomologische Zeitschrift 19(14 (1. Suppl.)):77.
 Max Bastelberger, 1907. Neue afrikanische Geometriden aus meiner Sammlung. - Internationale Entomologische Zeitschrift, Guben 1:109, 119–120, 135–136, 157, 167–168.
 Max Bastelberger: Weitre Neubeschreibungen exotischer Geometriden in meiner Sammlung. Jahrbücher des Nassauischen Vereins für Naturkunde, 61: 78-87, Wiesbaden 1908.
 Max Bastelberger: Besprechung und Beschreibung einiger neuer oder sonst interessanter Arten von exotischen Geometriden im Naturhistorischen Museum zu Wiesbaden. Jahrbücher des Nassauischen Vereins für Naturkunde, 61: 72-77, Wiesbaden 1908
 Max Bastelberger: Beschreibung neuer exotischer Geometriden aus meiner Sammlung. Entomologische Zeitschrift, 22: 158-159, Stuttgart 1908.

References

German entomologists
1851 births
1916 deaths